Franchimont Castle is a medieval castle in the municipality of Theux, Liège Province, Wallonia, Belgium.

History

It is thought to have originally been built in the 11th century, as a stronghold of the Prince-Bishopric of Liège. The original building was extended several times during the Middle Ages, once after a fire in 1387.

In 1487 the castle was besieged, and around the same period the La Marck family took ownership of it. In the early 16th century the outer wall was built, with casemates and an artillery tower added.

The prince-bishops of Liège took the title of Marquis of Franchimont at the start of the 16th century, with Franchimont Castle serving as the base of the Marquessate of Franchimont. The Marquessate was a small province of the Prince-Bishopric, six leagues long by four leagues wide, bounded in by the Duchy of Limburg (to the east), the Duchy of Luxemburg (fragmented, to the south and the west) and the Princely Abbey of Stavelot-Malmedy (fragmented, to the south and the northwest).

Modern

Today the castle is owned by the town of Theux and is open to the public. The artillery tower at the north-east corner contains a small exhibition and the ticket office.

See also
List of castles in Belgium

Notes

References
 Franchimont, A guided tour - leaflet obtained at the castle

External links

 Franchimont Castle official website (fr)
 Franchimont Castle www.castles.nl

Castles in the Ardennes (Belgium)
Ruined castles in Belgium
Castles in Belgium
Castles in Liège Province
Theux